Sivasankaran Nair, popularly known as Sivan (14 May 1932 – 24 June 2021) was an Indian cinematographer, film director known for his works in Malayalam cinema. Sivan won national film award three times. He was the first government press photographer in Travancore and Thiru-Kochi. He was the father of Sangeeth Sivan, Santhosh Sivan and Sanjeev Sivan and Saritha Rajeev.

Sivan was the still photographer of national award-winning Malayalam film Chemmeen.

His directorial debut film was Swapnam in 1972. Some of his popular films are Abhayam, Yagam, Oru Yathra, Keshu, Kochu Kochu Mohangal and Kilivathil.

Sivan died on 24 June 2021 due to cardiac arrest in his house at Thiruvananthapuram.

Early life 
Sivan was the second child of 
Padeettathil Gopalapillai and Bhavaniamma in Harippad. He was the second amongst their six children. His full name was Sivasankaran Nair.

References

1932 births
2021 deaths
Malayalam film directors
Film directors from Thiruvananthapuram